Year Of The Quiet Sun may refer to:

In film:
A Year of the Quiet Sun, a 1984 Polish film written and directed by Krzysztof Zanussi

In literature:
The Year of the Quiet Sun, a 1970 science fiction novel by Wilson Tucker
The Year of the Quiet Sun: One Year at Scott Base, Antarctica: A Personal Impression, a 1968 nonfiction account by Adrian Hayter
In Science:
 International Quiet Sun Year (IQSY), the name given to a series of coordinated Sun-related observational programs performed in 1964 and 1965